Ling Jie (born 22 January 2003) is a Chinese footballer currently playing as a forward for Guangzhou.

Career statistics

Club
.

References

2003 births
Living people
Chinese footballers
Association football forwards
Chinese Super League players
Guangzhou F.C. players